Ugbo is one of the few aborigines east of the River Niger, Nigeria, and has existed in its current location dating back to the Ancient History (3000 BC – AD 500). The town is known for its natural habitat, including serene hills, caves, large rocks and stones, rivers, forests, wild animals, and fertile lands. Ugbo is the ancestral home to many towns in Igboland. Ogulugu (which later split into Ugbo and the neighboring Obeagu community) is the oldest son of Ewa, the original progenitor of nearby communities, including Amoli, Agbudu, Isu-Awaa (Ewa), Ituku, and Ogbaku. The Ewa (Awaa) kindred, together with Ntuegbe, make up what is known as Mbanabor clan in Awgu LGA of Enugu State. Based on 2006 census, the population of Ugbo is projected to be about 32,000. Ugbo comprises three large villages, namely, Ugbo-Okpala, Ugbonabor, and Ngene Ugbo.

Location 
Ugbo is located in a hill-top, northwest part of Awgu Local Government Area, Enugu State. The town occupies a vast area of land bounded by other communities, such as Obeagu to the southwest, Achi to the west, Amoli to the northwest, Owelli to the north, Ogugu to the east, and Mmaku to the south.

Traditional government   
Ugbo features traditional rulers and chiefs.

Religion   
There are two main types of religion in Ugbo, namely, Native Religion and Christianity.
Native Religion: Many deities and oracles exist in the town but most notable is the Anu Ogulugu. The Anu Ogulugu is the supreme deity and sits at a hilltop, Umu-Ewa, the ancestral home of the different Ewa communities, from where he is worshiped and oversees the welfare of Ugbo and the entire Ewa people. Christianity: After a stern resistance and a fierce battle that lasted for years, the White Christian Missionaries finally gained entrance to Ugbo in the year 1917. Since then, Christianity has grown in the town with many denominations but most common have been the Anglicans and the Catholics. Notable churches are the Emmanuel Anglican Church, Ugbo-Okpala (1918); St. Anthony's Catholic Church Ugbonabor|St. Anthony's Catholic Church Ugbonabor (1933); St. Bridget's Catholic Church, Ngene Ugbo (1935; and the Christ Apostolic Church, Ugbo-Okpala.

Festivals   
Ugbo celebrates Native as well as Christian festivals. Prominent native feasts include Iriji ohu (new yam festival) which is observed yearly; the famous Aju (Iwa ekwa-age grade celebration) which comes every three years in the month of August; and Olili Anu Ogulugu, which is also commemorated at three-year intervals. It is worthy of note that the Olili Anu Ogulugu has lost steam in recent years due to the growing popularity of Christian religion in the town. The common Christian celebrations are the Christmas and Easter, marked every year for the birth of Jesus Christ and his ascension to heaven, respectively.

Education  
The town has two secondary schools: Community Secondary School Ugbo-Okpala, and Community Secondary School, Ugbo, in addition to Police Secondary School, Ugbo currently under construction by the Federal Government of Nigeria. It also has a Computer centre, three primary schools in the three main villages, and other private schools.

Healthcare   
The entire Ugbo community is served by the Community Health Centers at Ugbonabor and Ngene Ugbo constructed by community age grades.

Water   
Primary source of water is the famous Oji-River, which originates at Ishi Oji in Agu Ewa in Ugbo. The river traverses through the entire town before flowing to the neighboring communities. Ugbo also enjoys modern developments in water resources through the construction of Ugbo Dam and borehole water projects.

Road    
Ugbo boasts of two major roads: the 5 km Ugbo-Achi and 4 km Ugbo-Mmaku roads. The town also boasts of a network of inter and intra-village asphalt roads.

Economics   
Ugbo has a diversified economic base. The town is blessed with highly qualified manpower as evidenced by individual successes in the fields of agriculture, education, politics, trade and industry. Ugbo is also endowed with abundant but untapped natural resources, including stones, clay, iron, fertile land, and traces of coal and gas deposits. The agricultural mainstay of the town includes yam, cocoyam, and cassava cultivation. The Ugbo cocoyam (Ede ndi Ugbo)  is the choice of buyers who travel from  all parts of Southern Nigeria to the central market, Nkwo Ugbo, where sellers from the three main villages converge after every four market days.

Culture   
Ugbo has diverse native cultures which have eroded in recent times due to the influence of Christianity in the community. See Religion. Yet, the town still boasts of cultural masquerade and dance groups, most notably, Ogba Agu Cultural Dance, Ugbo-Okpala; Okobolo, Ugbonabor; and women dance groups, among others, which typically feature during traditional ceremonies.

See also

Towns in Enugu State